Bailey V5 may refer to:

Bailey V5 engine
Bailey V5 paramotor